Calamotropha bradleyi is a moth in the family Crambidae. It was described by Stanisław Błeszyński in 1960. It is found in South Africa.

References

Endemic moths of South Africa
Crambinae
Moths described in 1960